("the Islamic Group"; also transliterated  El Gama'a El Islamiyya; also called "Islamic Groups" and transliterated  Gamaat Islamiya, al Jamaat al Islamiya, is an Egyptian Sunni Islamist movement, and is considered a terrorist organization by the United Kingdom and the European Union. El Gama'a El Islamiyya was removed from the list of Foreign Terrorist Organizations by the United States in May 2022. The group was dedicated to the overthrow of the Egyptian government and replacing it with an Islamic state; the group has committed to peaceful means following the coup that toppled Mohamed Morsi.

From 1992 to 1998, al-Gama'a al-Islamiyya fought an insurgency against the Egyptian government during which at least 796 Egyptian policemen and soldiers, al-Gama'a al-Islamiyya fighters, and civilians including dozens of tourists were killed. During the fighting al-Gama'a al-Islamiyya was given support by the governments of Iran and Sudan, as well as from al-Qaeda. The Egyptian government received support during that time from the United States.

The group(s) is said to have constituted "the Islamist movement's only genuine mass organizations" in Egypt. While the assassination of the Egyptian president Anwar Sadat in 1981 is generally thought to have been carried out by another Islamist group, Egyptian Islamic Jihad, some have suggested al-Gamaa was responsible for or at least related to the assassination. In 2003, the imprisoned leadership of the group renounced bloodshed, and a series of high-ranking members were released, and the group was allowed to resume semi-legal peaceful activities. Then again some of its members were released in 2011. The imprisoned cleric Omar Abdel-Rahman was a spiritual leader of the movement, and the group actively campaigned for his release until his death in 2017.

Following the Egyptian Revolution of 2011, the movement formed a political party, the Building and Development Party, which gained 13 seats in the 2011–2012 elections to the lower house of the Egyptian Parliament.

History

Origins in universities 
Al-Gama'a al-Islamiyya began as an umbrella organization for Egyptian militant student groups, formed, like the Egyptian Islamic Jihad, after the leadership of the Muslim Brotherhood renounced violence in the 1970s.

In its early days, the group was primarily active on university campuses, and was mainly composed of university students. Originally they were a minority in the Egyptian student movement which was dominated by leftist Nasserists and Marxists. The leftists were strongly critical of the new Sadat government, and urged Egypt to fight a war of revenge against Israel, while President Sadat wanted to wait and rebuild the military. However, with some "discrete, tactical collaboration" with the government, who sought a "useful counterweight" to its leftist opponents, the group(s) began to grow in influence in 1973.

The Gama'at spread quite rapidly on campuses and won up to one-third of all student union elections. These victories provided a platform from which the associations campaigned for Islamic dress, the veiling of women, and the segregation of classes by gender. Secular university administrators opposed these goals.
By March 1976, they were "dominant force" in the student movement and by 1977 "they were in complete control of the universities and had driven the left organizations underground."

Expansion 
Having once been favored by the Egyptian government of Anwar Sadat they now threatened it, passionately opposing what they believed was a "shameful peace with the Jews," aka the Camp David Accords with Israel. By 1979, they began to be harassed by the government but their numbers grew steadily. In 1979, Sadat sought to diminish the influence of the associations through a law that transferred most of the authority of the student unions to professors and administrators. During the 1980s, however, Islamists gradually penetrated college faculties. At Assiut University, which was the scene of some of the most intense clashes between Islamists and their opponents (including security forces, secularists, and Copts), the president and other top administrators – who were Islamists – supported Gama'at demands to end mixed-sex classes and to reduce total female enrollment. In other universities Gama'at also forbade the mixing of genders, films, concerts, and dances, and enforced their bans with clubs and iron bars. From the universities the groups reached out to make new recruits, preaching in poor neighbourhoods of cities, and to rural areas. and after a crackdown against them, inmates of Egyptian jails.

In April 1981, the group became involved in what was probably started as a clan feud/vendetta about livestock or property lines between Coptic and Muslim Egyptians in the vicinity of Minya, Egypt. The group believed in the position of tributary or dhimmi for Christians in Egypt and opposed any signs of Coptic "arrogance" (istikbar), such as Christian cultural identity and opposition to an Islamic state. The group distributed a leaflet accusing Egypt's one Christian provincial governor (appointed by the government) of providing automatic weapons to Christians to attack Muslims, and the Sadat administration of following orders given by the United States.

Crackdown 
In June 1981, a brutal sectarian Muslim-Copt fight broke out in the poor al-Zawaiyya Al Hamra district of Cairo. Over three days of fighting, 17 people were killed, 112 injured, and 171 public and private buildings were damaged. "Men and women were slaughtered; babies thrown from windows, their bodies crushed on the pavement below; there was looting, killing and arson." Islamic Group(s) were accused of participating in the incident and in September 1981, one month before the assassination of Sadat, the Al-Gama'a al-Islamiyya were dissolved by the state (although they had never been legally registered in the first place), their infrastructure was destroyed and their leaders arrested.

Assassination of president Anwar Sadat 

In 1980, the Egyptian Islamic Jihad under the leadership of Muhammad abd-al-Salam Faraj, formed a coalition with the Gama'a under the leadership of Karam Zuhdi, with both agreeing to follow the guidance of Sheikh Omar Abdel-Rahman.  One of Faraj's groups was responsible for the assassination of President Anwar Sadat in 1981. Following the assassination, Karam Zuhdi expressed regret for conspiring with Egyptian Islamic Jihad in the assassination, according to the Council on Foreign Relations. Zuhdi was among the 900 militants who were set free in April 2006 by the Egyptian government.

Omar Abdel-Rahman 
The cleric Omar Abdel-Rahman was the spiritual leader of the movement. He was accused of participating in the World Trade Center 1993 bombings conspiracy, and was convicted and sentenced to life imprisonment for his espousal of a subsequent conspiracy to bomb New York City landmarks, including the United Nations and FBI offices. The Islamic Group had publicly threatened to retaliate against the United States if Rahman was not released from prison. However, the group later renounced violence and their leaders and members were released from prison in Egypt. Abdel-Rahman died on 18 February 2017.

1990s terrorism campaign 
While the Islamic group had originally been an amorphous movement of local groups centered in mosques without offices or membership roll, by the late 1980s it became more organized and "even adopted an official logo: an upright sword standing on an open Qur'an with an orange sun rising in the background," encircled by the Qur'anic verse that Abdel Rahman had quoted at his trials while trying to explain his interpretation of jihad to the judges:
وَقَاتِلُوهُمْ حَتَّى لاَ تَكُونَ فِتْنَةٌ وَيَكُونَ الدِّينُ لِلّهِ فَإِنِ انتَهَواْ فَلاَ عُدْوَانَ إِلاَّ عَلَى الظَّالِمِينَ

Fight them on until there is no more Tumult, and there prevail justice and faith in Allah; but if they cease, Let there be no hostility except to those who practise oppression.

This became the official motto of the group.

The 1990s saw Al-Gama'a al-Islamiyya engage in an extended campaign of violence, from the murders and attempted murders of prominent writers and intellectuals, to the repeated targeting of tourists and foreigners. Serious damage was done to the largest sector of Egypt's economy – tourism – and in turn to the government, but it also devastated the livelihoods of many of the people on whom the group depends for support.

Victims of campaign against the Egyptian state from 1992 to 1997 totaled more than 1200 and included the head of the counter-terrorism police (Major General Raouf Khayrat), a speaker of parliament (Rifaat al-Mahgoub), dozens of European tourists and Egyptian bystanders, and over 100 Egyptian police.

The 1991 killing of the group's leader, Ala Mohieddin, presumably by security forces, led Al-Gama'a al-Islamiyya to murder Egypt's speaker of parliament in retaliation. In June 1995, working together with Egyptian Islamic Jihad, the group staged a carefully planned attempt on the life of President Mubarak, led by Mustafa Hamza, a senior Egyptian member of the Al-Qaeda and commander of the military branch of the Al-Gama'a al-Islamiyya. Mubarak escaped unharmed and retaliated with a massive and ruthless crackdown on GI members and their families in Egypt.

Tal'at Fu'ad Qasim was arrested in Croatia in 1995.

Failed nonviolence initiative 
By 1997, the movement had become paralyzed. 20,000 Islamists were in custody in Egypt and thousands more had been killed by the security forces. In July of that year, Islamist lawyer Montassir al-Zayyat brokered a deal between the Al-Gama'a al-Islamiyya and the Egyptian government, called the Nonviolence Initiative, whereby the movement formally renounced violence. The next year the government released 2,000 members of the Islamic Group. After the initiative was declared Sheikh Omar Abdul Rahman also gave his approval from his prison cell in the United States, though he later withdrew it.

The initiative divided the Islamic Group between members in Egypt who supported it and those in exile who wanted the attacks to continue. Leading the opposition was EIJ leader Ayman Zawahiri who termed it "surrender" in angry letters to the London newspaper Al-Sharq al-Awsat.

Temple of Hatshepsut attack 

Zawahiri enlisted Ahmed Refai Taha, both exiles in Afghanistan with him, to sabotage the initiative with a massive terrorism attack that would provoke the government into repression. So on 17 November 1997 Al-Gama'a al-Islamiyya killing campaign climaxed with the attack at the Temple of Hatshepsut (Deir el-Bahri) in Luxor, in which a band of six men dressed in police uniforms machine-gunned and hacked to death with knives 58 foreign tourists and four Egyptians. "The killing went on for 45 minutes, until the floors streamed with blood. The dead included a five-year-old British child and four Japanese couples on their honeymoons." Altogether 71 people were killed. The attack stunned Egyptian society, devastated the tourist industry for a number of years, and consequently sapped a large segment of popular support for violent Islamism in Egypt.

The revulsion of Egyptians and rejection of jihadi terrorism was so complete, the attack's supporters backpedaled. The day after the attack, Refai Taha claimed the attackers intended only to take the tourists hostage, despite the evidence of the systematic nature of the slaughter. Others denied Islamist involvement completely. Sheikh Omar Abdel-Rahman blamed Israelis for the killings, and Zawahiri maintaining the Egyptian police had done it.

When Refai Taha signed the al-Qaeda fatwa "International Islamic Front for Jihad Against Jews and Crusaders" to kill Crusaders and Jews on behalf of the Islamic Group, he was "forced to withdraw his name" from the fatwa, explaining to fellow members ... than he had "only been asked over the telephone to join in a statement of support for the Iraqi people."

Attacks 
Major attacks by Al-Gama'a al-Islamiyya:
8 June 1992 – assassination of Farag Foda.
26 June 1995 – attempt to assassinate Egyptian President Hosni Mubarak in Addis Ababa, Ethiopia.
20 October 1995 – Car bomb attack on police station in Rijeka, Croatia.
28 April 1996 – a mass shooting outside the Europa Hotel, Cairo, killing 17 Greek tourists mistaken for Israelis.
17 November 1997 – Luxor massacre at Deir el-Bahri, Luxor, Egypt. 58 foreign tourists and four Egyptians killed.

It was also responsible for a spate of tourist shootings (trains and cruise ships sprayed with bullets) in middle and upper Egypt during the early 1990s. As a result of those attacks, cruise ships ceased sailing between Cairo and Luxor.

Renouncing terrorism 

After spending more than two decades in prison and after intense debates and discussions with Al-Azhar scholars, most of the leaders of Al-Gama'a Al-Islamiyya have written several books renouncing their ideology of violence and some of them went as far as calling ex-Egyptian president Anwar Sadat, whom they assassinated, a martyr.

Al-Gama'a al-Islamiyya renounced bloodshed in 2003, and in September 2003 Egypt freed more than 1,000 members, citing what Interior Minister Habib el-Adli called the group's stated "commitment to rejecting violence."

Harsh repressive measures by the Egyptian government and the unpopularity of the killing of foreign tourists have reduced the group's profile in recent years but the movement retains popular support among Egyptian Islamists who disapprove of the secular nature of Egypt's society and peace treaty with Israel.

In April 2006, the Egyptian government released approximately 1,200 members from prison, including a founder, Nageh Ibrahim.

Reportedly, there have been "only two instances where members showed signs of returning to their former violent ways, and in both cases they were betrayed by informants within their own group."

2011 revolution 
Following the 2011 Revolution, Al-Gamaa al-Islamiya established a political party, the Building and Development Party. In August 2011, it presented 6,700 proxies (signatures) to the Egyptian political parties' committee on behalf of its party. In a statement the Gamaa said that any legislation drafted in Egypt after the revolution must refer to the sharia of God, "who blessed us with this revolution. We believe that the suffering we endured during the past years was due to neglecting religion and putting those who don't fear [God] in power." It also stated that "Islam can contain everyone and respects the freedom of followers of other religions to refer to their own sharia in private affairs."

The Building and Development Party contested the 2011–2012 elections to the People's Council, the lower house of the Egyptian parliament, as part of the Islamic Alliance which was led by the salafi Al-Nour Party. It gained 13 seats: 12 in Upper Egypt and one in Suez.

In June 2013, Egypt's president Mohammed Morsi appointed Adel el-Khayat, a member of the group, as governor of Luxor. el-Khayat resigned within a week of his appointment due to public unrest related to the group's commission of the 1997 massacre in Luxor.

Beliefs 
One scholar studying the group, Gilles Kepel, found that the group repeatedly used the name of radical Islamist theorist Sayyid Qutb, and often quoted from his manifesto, Ma'alim fi al-Tariq (Milestones), in their leaflets and newsletters. They emphasized the right to legislate belongs to God alone; and that divine unity (tawhid) in Islam signifies liberation (tahrir) from all that is corrupt in thought  –including the liberation of all that is inherited or conventional, like customs and traditions.

There was a scant supply of any writing by the group's members, but some issues leading writer(s) of the gama'at thought worth mentioning included:
 Youth must be taught that Islam was nizam kamil wa shamil (a complete and perfect system) and must regulate government and war, the judicial system and the economy.
 Egypt's disastrous 1967 War was the result of following Arab nationalism rather than Islam.
 Signs of the growth of an Islamic movement were the wearing of the veil by women and the white gallabieh and untrimmed beard by men, early marriage, and attendance at public prayers on the major Muslim festivals, Eid al-Fitr and Eid al-adha.

While secularist social analyses of Egypt's socioeconomic problems maintained that poverty was caused by overpopulation or high defense expenditures, Al-Gama'at saw the cause in the populace's spiritual failures – laxness, secularism, and corruption. The solution was a return to the simplicity, hard work, and self-reliance of earlier Muslim life.

Members allegedly allying with al-Qaeda 
Deputy leader of al-Qaeda Ayman al-Zawahiri announced a new alliance with a faction of Al-Gama'a al-Islamiyya. In a video released on the internet on 5 August 2006. Zawahiri said "We bring good tidings to the Muslim nation about a big faction of the knights of Al-Gama'a Islamiyya uniting with Al-Qaeda," and the move aimed to help "rally the Muslim nation's capabilities in a unified rank in the face of the most severe crusader campaign against Islam in its history." An Al-Gama'a leader, Muhammad al-Hukaymah, appeared in the video and confirmed the unity move. However, Hukaymah acknowledged that other Al-Gama'a members had "backslid" from the militant course he was keeping to, and some Al-Gama'a representatives also denied that they were joining forces with the international Al-Qaeda network. Sheikh Abdel Akhar Hammad, a former Al-Gama'a leader, told Al-Jazeera: "If [some] brothers have joined, then this is their own personal view and I don't think that most Al-Gama'a members share that same opinion."

Foreign relations 
Designation as a terrorist organization
Countries and organizations below have officially listed the Jamaa Islamia as a terrorist organization.

See also 

 Terrorism in Egypt
 List of designated terrorist organizations

References

External links 
Al-Ghuroba (Followers of Ahlus Sunnah wal Jama'ah)
 (Center for Nonproliferation Studies, Monterey Institute of International Studies)
Article about Islamist resistance in Egypt
Article in the Economist about more recent developments
al-Gama'a al Islam home page
Egypt's Jihad Group leader wants end to violence
Violence won't work: how author of 'jihadists' bible' stirred up a storm
The Rebellion Within a New Yorker article about terrorists renouncing violence, with significant attention paid to the Islamic Group

Jihadist groups in Egypt
Organizations designated as terrorist by Canada
Organisations designated as terrorist by the European Union
Organizations designated as terrorist by Israel
Organizations designated as terrorist by Russia
Qutbist organisations
Salafi Jihadist groups
Organizations designated as terrorist by the United Arab Emirates
Organisations designated as terrorist by the United Kingdom
Organizations designated as terrorist by the United States
Organizations based in Africa designated as terrorist
Organisations of the Egyptian Crisis (2011–2014)